Emma Fredh (born 14 April 1990 in Borås) is a Swedish rower. She won the silver medal in the lightweight women's single sculls at the 2016 World Rowing Championships.

External links

1990 births
Living people
Swedish female rowers
People from Borås
World Rowing Championships medalists for Sweden
European Rowing Championships medalists
Sportspeople from Västra Götaland County
21st-century Swedish women